The Island of Limacos or Island of Caracoles, known in Spanish in the 16th century as Risgol and in French as  is an Algerian islet located near the North African coast. It is located in front of the mouth of the Tafna River, where the town of Rashgun is located. It is approximately halfway between Oran and the border between Algeria and Morocco. It was literarily described, along with other islets on the Maghreb coast, by the writer Pedro Mata as "one of those sea monsters sentinel that deflower the surface of the sea at various points" in his 1856 work .

Description 
The island of Limacos or Rachgoun is located four kilometers from the African coast, in front of the mouth of the Tafna River, which forms a bay bounded by Cape Acra to the east and Cape Bocchus to the west. The island is of volcanic origin, and is composed of basaltic rocks and Pliocene sandstones in the south.

It has a typically Mediterranean semi-arid climate, alternating between a rainy season in winter and a dry season in summer. The lack of rainfall (300–500 mm/year) is the consequence of a "shadow" effect caused by the Moroccan mountains of the Atlas and the Rif to the west and the massif systems of the Spanish southeast to the northwest, which prevent the passage of winds and cloud formations from Atlantic storms.

There is a lighthouse at the north end built by the French in 1870.

Flora and Fauna 
Currently, the island of Limacos or Rachgoun is uninhabited and free of direct anthropogenic pressure. It is situated on the main bird migration route of the western part of the Algerian coast. It is a refuge and nesting area for some species of birds that migrate between Eurasia and Africa, such as the Audouin's gull (Ichthyaetus audouinii) or the Eleanor's falcon (Falco eleonorae). It is also one of the places in the Mediterranean where the monk seal is still found. Since 2011 it is considered one of the Ramsar Sites in Algeria.

History 

It has been mentioned as a possible permanent Phoenician settlement despite its small size and apparent lack of subsistence resources.

In 931, the island became the refuge and stronghold of the Idrisi al-Hasan ben Abi-l-Ays. The Umayyad fleet of the recently proclaimed caliph of al-Andalus Abd al-Rahman III was sent —mainly from the port of Pechina— by him to harass the Idrisí and surround the island. However, this fleet could not continue with the harassing operations of the island and had to return to the Andalusian port in the autumn of 932.

Limacos is located a hundred kilometers west of the former Spanish domains of Oran and Mazalquivir —sold to the Ottomans in 1791 by King Carlos IV— and there are mentions that it could also have been a possession of Spain in the past, but was abandoned by it sometime between the 18th and 19th centuries.

The island was occupied in October 1835 by the French army, in the context of its fight against Abd al-Qádir, opposed to the French penetration in Algeria, with the aim of serving as a coastal surveillance point as well as hindering the supply of arms and ammunition to the anti-French rebels. Limacos has also been mentioned as a possible frequent fishing ground for Spanish fishing boats throughout the 18th and early 20th centuries, the latter mainly coming from Tarifa, Málaga and Altea.

Even though the island was abandoned, there are claims of Spanish sovereignty until the 20th century, when it was recognized as "Spanish" at the 1906 Algeciras Conference, as well as appearing in Spanish charters and documents during the 19th and 20th centuries. However, currently, the island is under Algerian sovereignty and the claims and mentions of "Spanishness" of the island in official documents simply disappeared during the 20th century.

References 

Algeria
Mediterranean islands